This is a list of Antarctic ice shelves.

Ice shelves are attached to a large portion of the Antarctic coastline. Their total area is 1,541,700 km2. Names are also listed in the Scientific Committee on Antarctic Research, Gazetteer. The ice shelf areas are listed below, clockwise, starting in the west of East Antarctica:

† Indicates that the ice shelf has collapsed.

See also
List of Antarctic ice streams
List of glaciers in the Antarctic
Retreat of glaciers since 1850

References

 
Ice shelves
Antarctic ice shelves